This is a list of Australian soccer transfers for the 2013–14 W-League. Only moves featuring at least one W-League club are listed.

Transfers

All players without a flag are Australian. Clubs without a flag are clubs participating in the W-League. All transfers between W-League clubs include a free transfer period in the off-season since prior to the 2017–18 season, the W-League didn't have multi-year contracts.

Pre-season

Mid-season

Re-signings

Notes

References

A-League Women transfers
transfers
transfers
Football transfers summer 2013
Football transfers winter 2013–14
A-League Women lists